Athens Transit is a public bus system in Athens, Georgia, United States.  The system was started in 1976, and today 20 routes operate throughout the city. The whole system is fare free.   Most bus routes have the buses stop at a given location once per hour during operating hours.

Most routes are designed as loops, with outbound buses on a given route not returning on the same streets.  This can prove confusing, but major streets generally have two routes serving them: one outbound, and one inbound.  Most routes terminate at the Athens Multi-Modal Transportation Center, which was built in 2006 on a brownfield near the North Oconee River.  The Multi-Modal Center was a winner of the 2007 Innovative Design in Engineering and Architecture award from the American Institute of Steel Construction, and it is designed to accommodate a future "Brain Train" to Atlanta.

Athens Transit and UGA Campus Transit buses were part of an early trial of biodiesel fuel during the 1996 Olympics.

Athens Transit was formerly known as "The Bus" but in 2018 it was changed to its current branding as "Athens-Clarke County Transit" as it was one of the few remaining A-CC services that did not refer to "Athens-Clarke" in its name.

External links
 Real-time Athens Transit bus tracking

References

Bus transportation in Georgia (U.S. state)
Transportation in Athens, Georgia
Transit agencies in Georgia (U.S. state)